Carlos Augusto Bonvalot (24 July 1893 – 13 February 1934) was an early 20th-century Portuguese painter, noted for his portraits of an intimist nature and for his realist depictions of daily life around the town of Cascais. Apart from painting, Bonvalot was an important authority in conservation and restoration of artworks; most notably, he was a pioneer in the country in the technical examination of paintings using X-rays.

References

1893 births
1934 deaths
20th-century Portuguese painters
20th-century Portuguese male artists
Conservator-restorers
People from Cascais
Portuguese realist painters
Portuguese male painters